The Abaca Festival or formally known as Catanduanes Abaka Festival is a festival held each year in Virac, Catanduanes, Philippines. The celebration happens every 4th week of the month of May. The festival is cognizance of the importance of abaca fiber or Manila hemp industry in the local economy and the need to showcase its versatility as a major source of livelihood and craft material which has brought Catanduanes fame and fortune. The festival will showcase the life and resilient spirit of the Catandunganon and its culture, as well as the uniqueness and exoticness of the island and its people.

Catanduanes Island is the native habitat of the endemic abaca plant (a banana relative) which is globally renowned for its strong fiber. In fact, the Philippines FIDA (Fiber Industry Development Authority) declared the island as the highest abaca producing province in 2010. In 2009-2013, The Philippine Rural Development Program (PRDP) and the Department of Agriculture, Bicol Region had 39% share of Philippine Abaca production, emerged as the biggest produce while overwhelming 92% comes from Catanduanes the biggest abaca producing province in the country. The island province is also home of the finest grade of abaca fiber.

On April 15, 2022, President Rodrigo Duterte has signed the Republic Act No. 11700 declaring Catanduanes province as the Philippines Abaca Capital.

Events

The main features of the festival are: Padadyaw Ginamlangan or Padadyaw kan Abaka, Pinukpok Fashion Show, Urag Catandungan sports competitions, Kantang Catandungan or Musika kan Isla, Festival Dance Competition, Binibini and Ginoong Bikol, Hagyan sa Kabitoonan and Jobs Fair.

See also
Virac, Catanduanes
Catanduanes
Catandungan Festival

References

Festivals in Bicol Region
Cultural festivals in the Philippines
Culture of Catanduanes